Hedwig Jarke  (1882–1949) was a German artist.

Biography 
Jarke was born in 1882 in Berlin. 
She died in 1949 in Starnberg.  Her work is in the collection of the Städtisches Kunstmuseum Spendhaus Reutlingen (Municipal Art Museum, Spendhaus Reutlingen) and the Minneapolis Institute of Art.

Gallery

References

External links

1882 births
1949 deaths
Artists from Berlin
19th-century German women artists
20th-century German women artists
German printmakers